Grand Canyon Bar 10 Airport  is a public-use airport located  south-east of the CBD of Whitmore, in Mohave County, Arizona, United States, near the Grand Canyon.

Facilities and aircraft 
It has one runway:
 16/34 measuring 4,600 x 40 feet (1,404 x 12 m) with an asphalt/dirt surface

For the 12-month period ending April 21, 2010, the airport had 1,800 general aviation aircraft operations, an average of five per day. At that time there were no aircraft based at this airport.

References

External links 

 
 Bar 10's website

Airports in Mohave County, Arizona